Murder at the Margin (1978) is a whodunnit written by U.S. economists William Breit and Kenneth G. Elzinga using the joint pseudonym Marshall Jevons. The novel introduces Harvard economist Henry Spearman, a small, middle-aged, balding man who, when faced with murder, turns into an amateur sleuth who solves crimes by means of economic reasoning.

References

See also

 The Fatal Equilibrium (1985)

1978 American novels
American mystery novels
Works published under a pseudonym